Hurry may refer to:

Hurry (EP), a 2001 EP by Tin Foil Phoenix
Hurry (band), an indie rock band from Philadelphia, Pennsylvania
Hurry (surname)
Hurry, Maryland, a community in the United States
Hurry Inlet in Greenland
Hurrying, a child employed in a coal mine to transport coal
Hurry, a curling term
Quarterback hurry, a type of defensive pressure in American football